The Yasar Dogu Tournament 1996, was a wrestling event held in Ankara, Turkey between 11 and 13 March 1996. This tournament was held as 24th.

This international tournament includes competition includes competition in men's  freestyle wrestling. This ranking tournament was held in honor of the two time Olympic Champion, Yaşar Doğu.

Medal table

Medal overview

Men's freestyle

Participating nations

References 

Yasar Dogu 1996
1996 in sport wrestling
Sports competitions in Ankara
Yaşar Doğu Tournament
International wrestling competitions hosted by Turkey